Animal mummification was common in ancient Egypt. Animals were an enormous part of Egyptian culture, not only in their role as food and pets, but also for religious reasons. Many different types of animals were mummified, typically for four main purposes: to allow beloved pets to go on to the afterlife, to provide food in the afterlife, to act as offerings to a particular god, and because some were seen as physical manifestations of specific deities that the Egyptians worshipped. Bastet, the cat goddess, is an example of one such deity. In 1888, an Egyptian farmer digging in the sand near Istabl Antar discovered a mass grave of felines, ancient cats that were mummified and buried in pits at great numbers.

Egypt aside, pre-Columbian bird mummies have been found in the Atacama Desert of Chile, including some next to the oasis town of Pica. These mummies were part of unknown rituals and a long-range trade from the humid tropics across the Altiplano and the Andes to reach Atacama Desert in modern Chile. If bird distribution was as in present, the closest place to Pica from where all bird species could have been captured is Beni Department in northern Bolivia. The mummified birds found in Atacama Desert had their organs removed as well as their tail feathers. Some bird mummies were found wrapped in textiles.

Egyptian beliefs about animals  

Throughout the history of ancient Egypt, animals were highly respected. In no other culture have animals been as influential in so many aspects of life, nor has any culture depicted animals so often in their artwork or writing. It is estimated that two in every four or five Egyptian hieroglyphs relates to animals. Egyptians believed that animals were crucial to both physical and spiritual survival—vital to physical survival because they were a major source of food and to spiritual survival based on how well a person treated animals during their life on earth. Some animals were considered to be literal incarnations of the deities, and therefore, it is understandable why Egyptians would have wanted to hold such animals in the highest regard, giving them a proper burial through mummification. The Egyptian religion taught of life after death. In order to determine a person's admittance or denial to the afterlife, the deities would ask a series of judgment questions. One of these crucial questions would be whether they had mistreated any animals during their life on earth. Because of this religious belief, the killing of an animal was considered a serious crime punishable by death. Diodorus Siculus, a Greek historian from the first century B.C., witnessed the lynching of a Roman who had accidentally killed a cat during a visit to Egypt. Understandably, this punishment frightened many Egyptians to the point that if one would happen upon a dead animal, they would flee from it as to avoid the accusation of being its killer.

Beloved pets 

Long before animal mummies were used as religious offerings, animals in Egypt were occasionally mummified for a more personal reason—as beloved pets that were to keep the deceased company in the afterlife. The most common Egyptian pets included cats, dogs, mongooses, monkeys, gazelles, and birds. Many Egyptians loved their pets, and the customary process of mourning the loss of a loved pet included crying and shaving one's eyebrows. Ancient Egyptian pets were given names like we name our pets today, evidenced by more than seventy names deciphered in inscriptions identifying pet dog mummies. Pets were often depicted on the tombs of Egyptians, indicating their masters’ affection toward the animals. Egyptians believed that mummification was imperative in order to gain admittance to the afterlife, and therefore the belief was that the mummification of these pets would ensure the animals’ immortality.

Specific archaeological findings have confirmed that pets were mummified. The most famous example of this is the Theban priestess Maatkare Mutemhat’s African green monkey (Chlorocebus aethiops). When her tomb was discovered, there was a small, mummified bundle present at her feet, which was initially believed to be her child. This puzzled archaeologists because Maatkare Mutemhat was a High Priestess who had taken a serious vow of celibacy. If this had been her child, it would have meant that she had, at some point, broken the oath she had taken as High Priestess, raising a slew of other questions regarding her life. Finally, in 1968, an X-ray was done on the small mummy and it was determined to be an adult African green monkey (Chlorocebus aethiops), not a child. Similarly, Makare's half sister, Esemkhet, was discovered buried with a mummified pet—she had a mummified gazelle in her tomb.

Prince Tuthmosis of the Eighteenth Dynasty was also buried with a beloved animal—his pet cat was mummified and placed in a stone coffin in his tomb. Another Egyptian, named Hapymen, had his pet dog mummified, wrapped in cloth, and placed at the side of his coffin. At the tomb KV50 in the Valley of Kings, a mummified dog and baboon were discovered buried together, although the owner is unknown.

Food for the afterlife
Egyptians believed that the afterlife would be a continuation of this one, allowing for the transportation of items from this life to the next. In order to bring food to the afterlife, Egyptians would surround human mummies by what are known as victual mummies. These animals were prepared by dehydrating the meat and wrapping it in linen bandages, to indicate that the animals were food, not pets. They were not mummified to the same meticulous extent that a pet or human mummy would be, but the animals were nonetheless carefully preserved using natron and other special salts. This food was included in tombs in order to sustain the deceased person's soul, called the ka, during the journey to the next world. A variety of food has been found in many tombs, mostly breads, meats, and fowl. King Tutankhamun's tomb held several coffin-shaped wooden boxes containing this type of mummified animal, in his case duck and other types of meat.

Religious purposes

Ancient Egyptian religion was characterized by polytheism, the belief in multiple deities. Prior to the unification of Upper and Lower Egypt, there were a tremendous number of these deities, each representative of a different element of the natural world. After the great unification, a more limited list of deities developed. These were usually depicted as having a human body and an animal head, further emphasizing the importance of animals in Egyptian religion. Over time, religious cults emerged for the worship of each specific deity. Two main types of worship distinguished the cults: the first choosing to worship the god through mass mummified animal offerings, and the second selecting a totem animal to represent the god, which was mummified at the time of its death.

Votive offerings
The vast majority of Egyptian animal mummies were religious offerings. If an Egyptian sought a favor from a deity, an offering would be made or purchased, and placed at the appropriate temple of the god. Before animal mummification became common, these offerings were usually bronze statues depicting the animals. However, eventually a cheaper alternative to bronze statues (i.e., animal mummies) became the most popular form of offering. Literally millions of these mummified animals have been discovered throughout Egypt. Inspection of these mummies, usually done through CT scans which allow researchers to examine the skeletons of the mummies without damaging the outer wrappings, has suggested that these types of animals were bred for the sole purpose of offerings. As the process of animal mummification for the purpose of offerings grew, mummification techniques became progressively less meticulous. Studies have revealed many of the large-scale animal offerings to be "fakes" (the wrappings containing only a few bones, feathers, reeds, wood, or pieces of pottery). The animals were raised on temple grounds, and then sold to pilgrims or regular citizens. The necks of the animals were often broken, an indication that their sole purpose in life was to be sacrificed as offerings. When visiting the temples, Egyptians of the general public would purchase these pre-mummified animals and offer them to the gods.

The Egyptian god Hor, living in the second century BCE suggests the purpose underlying the practice of mummifying animals: "The benefit [of mummification] which is performed for the Ibis, the soul of Toth, the greatest one, is made for the Hawk also, the soul of Ptah, the soul of Apis, the soul of Pre, the soul of Shu, the soul of Tefnut, the soul of Geb, the soul of Osiris, the soul of Isis, the soul of Nephtys, the great gods of Egypt, the Ibis and the Hawk." Hor believes that the mummies are the souls of the gods: he describes the ibis as the soul of Toth and the hawk as the soul of many different gods. That is to say, some animals were, or contained, a ba, a part of the soul that is an active agents in this world and the spiritual world. Therefore, votive animal mummies are the animals' souls acted as messengers between people on earth and the gods.

Cats 

Cats were mummified as religious offerings in enormous quantities and were believed to represent the war goddess Bastet. This cult was primarily centered at Thebes and Beni Hasan beginning in the Ptolemaic Period. In addition, thousands of cat mummies have been found at the catacombs of Saqqara. Cats who were bred to become offerings of this type usually died due to strangulation or the breaking of their necks. During mummification, the cat bodies would be dried and filled with soil, sand or some other kind of packing material. They were either positioned with their limbs folded closely to their bodies or in a sitting, lifelike position. The wrapping was usually completed through intricate, geometric patterns.

Early in the development of animal mummification, cat mummies were placed in little bronze or wooden sarcophagi. More expensive mummies were typically adorned with features drawn in black paint and colored glass, obsidian or rock crystal eyes. Kittens and fetuses were mummified and buried inside the stomach of a statue that represented their mother. As time went by, like all mummies designed for this purpose, the mummification became less precise. In fact, Sir T. C. S. Morrison-Scott, former Director of the British Museum of Natural History, unwrapped a large number of cat mummies, but discovered many were simply stuffed with random body parts of cats and not mummified with detailed care.

Ibises 

The ibis cult was established primarily during the Ptolemaic and Roman periods and was dedicated to the god of wisdom, Thoth.  Research from 2015 using 14C radiocarbon dating suggests that the Egyptian ibis mummies in the study were from time frame that falls between approximately 450 and 250 BC. This timing falls in Egyptian history between the Late Period to the Ptolemaic Period. The number of mummified ibises is extraordinary. Saqqara alone is estimated to contain nearly 500,000 of these mummies and is also thought to have produced 10,000 mummified offerings per year. In addition, approximately four million ibis burials have been uncovered at the catacombs of Tuna el-Gebel.

Mummification of the ibis included desiccation and evisceration. Usually, the head and neck of the bird were bent backwards and pressed on the body. The body was then dipped in tar and wrapped tightly with linen. The vast number of mummified ibises suggests that this was done in a mass production, as many times the mummies contained only a part of the body. After serving their ritual purposes, the mummified bodies were placed in ceramic pots, coffins or sarcophagi.

Baboons 
Baboons represented Thoth, the god of the moon as well as the god of wisdom. The appearance of baboons on canopic jars, which housed the organs of human mummies, is testament of the animals’ tremendous cultural significance. Baboons were reared in mass quantities at temples, though the numbers of baboon mummies that have been discovered are not as large as cats or ibises. Around 400 were uncovered at the tombs of Saqqara. Most baboons were mummified with the use of plaster  and buried in wooden chests. Baboon mummies that have been discovered have provided significant evidence that they were bred and mummified as offerings. This evidence includes proof that the baboons usually did not die from natural causes, and that the majority suffered from malnutrition, fractures, osteomylitis, and vitamin D deficiency.

Crocodiles 

The crocodile was regarded as an extremely fierce animal, often used to terrify enemies during war. The crocodile cult was devoted to Sebek, god of fertility, and the sun god, Re. Typically, crocodiles were raised in a life of complete luxury, indulged until they died. In the early years of this cult, dead crocodiles were lavishly mummified with gold and other precious things. However, as mummification gradually became a production process, less effort was exerted in their mummification and eventually consisted simply of cloth wrappings and the application of resin, a preserving agent. When found in extremely large quantities, crocodile mummies, like many other sorts of animal offerings, contained only reeds or random body parts. At the main temple of Shedet, later called Crocodilopolis, sacred crocodiles were mummified and displayed in temple shrines or carried in processions.

Fish 
Fish were mummified in mass quantities as offerings to the god. They were wrapped in linen and held together by bands of cloth soaked in sticky resin, permanently encasing the mummies. Many times, black circles representing the eyes were painted on the hardened linen. Several species of fish have been identified, but due to the deteriorating condition of the mummies, scientists are unable to conclude if the organs were typically removed during the process of mummification. According to the Museum of Liverpool, the Nile perch was one of the species mummified and offered to the gods; one of these cults is related to the goddess Neith.

Miscellaneous animals 
Additional animals mummified and the corresponding god they represented:
Mongoose/Shrew (Horus)
A large type of mongoose common in Africa, the ichneumon (Herpestes ichneumon) is represented in Egyptian art from the Old Kingdom onward. Revered for its ability to kill snakes, the ichneumon was related to Horus and Atum, among others and worshipped throughout the country. The shrew, a mouse size nocturnal mammal, substituted for ichneumons in Egyptian myth. Believed to have vision in both light and darkness, the god Horus Khenty-irty of Letopolis was represented by the wide eyed type of ichneumon and the shrew respectively. Shrews appear as the focus of worship particularly in the Late Period. See African giant shrew#Taxonomy.

Dogs/Jackals (Anubis)
Dogs were used as domestic pets, guardians, herders, and police assistants. Several dog breeds could be found in ancient Egypt, the most popular being the greyhound, basenji, and saluki, all very good for hunting. From the First Dynasty, Egyptians venerated several jackal deities, with the most prominent one was of Anubis. He was represented as a canine or a canine headed human. Traditionally, the Anubis animal has been identified as a jackal, but its generally black coloring, symbolic of the afterlife and rebirth, is not typical of jackals and may instead denote a wild dog. Because dogs and jackals roamed the desert's edge, where the dead were generally buried, they were seen as protectors of cemeteries.
Birds of all types (Horus) 
Birds were held in containers shaped like food because they would be used as food in the afterlife.
Serpent/Eel (Atum)
Among serpents and eels, snakes and lizards were also popular depictions of the god Atum. Serpents were seen as creatures of the earth that embody primeval, chthonic qualities, involved in the process of creation. Because many snakes inhabit marshes, they were closely linked to water and the primeval ocean of Nun. Egyptians were well aware of both the snake's usefulness in controlling vermin and the dangers posed by its poison. Texts like the Brooklyn Papyrus include remedies and magical spells to cure the bitten. Snake deities were worshipped in hopes of preventing potential attacks by their earthly representatives. Commonly mummified in the Late, Ptolemaic, and Roman periods, lizards did not play much of a role in earlier culture.
Beetles (Cherpera)
Among beetles, the scarab was very popular in Egyptian culture. Images of scarabs were placed in tombs as early as the fourth millennium BC and used as official seals and amulets for the living and the dead. The Egyptian word for scarab also means "to come into being" or "appear". A scarab pushing a spherical object evoked the image of a beetle propelling the sun disk through heaven.

Sacred animals 
Instead of worshipping every animal of a particular species, a few animal cults would select one specific animal, chosen because of its special markings, to be the totem of the particular god. Each sacred animal was pampered and cared for until its death, when elaborate burial proceedings took place. The animal was then mummified as a sign of respect to the god. Next, a new symbolic animal was chosen. Only one animal at a time would be chosen as the sacred one. These animal cults reached the pinnacle of popularity during the Late and Graeco-Roman Periods. The cycle of selecting a new totem animal continued for hundreds of years. Though the animals were undoubtedly considered sacred, Egyptians did not worship the individual animals themselves, but rather the invisible deity believed to be present within the animal symbolizing the god. In certain cases, such as the Apis bull, the animal could even be a way to communicate the desires of the god. The Apis bull cult was the main source of this type of religious animal mummy in ancient Egypt, as most other animals were mummified in large quantities for religious offerings.

Bulls 
The Apis bull cult is estimated to have originated as early as 800 B.C., the first cult supported by archaeological evidence. The earliest and largest of all animal cults, the Apis bull cult considered the bull to be a symbol of strength and fertility, representing the creator gods Ptah and Osiris. Mummification was a key part in the worshipping of these animals. While alive, the bull would be housed in a special temple, lavishly pampered for its entire life. Priests believed that the Apis bull was a medium of communication between the two creator gods, so its movements were carefully observed and sometimes consulted as an oracle.

These sacred animals were allowed to die a natural death unless they reached the age of 28, at which time they were killed. When an Apis bull died, the entire country went into mourning. It was afforded an elaborate funeral and intricate burial procedures. Because the bulls were so large, the process of mummification was lengthy and complicated. Enormous alabaster embalming tables were constructed at Memphis, the center of the cult. They were complete with engravings and fluid drainage channels. After the funerary ceremonies, the bull would be transported to these tables where it would be strapped to the table. Its internal organs would be destroyed through intra-anal oils. The animal's body would be dried out using natron salts and packed with sand. It would then be wrapped in linens. Artificial eyes and an artistic plaster head would be added, ensuring the bull still looked like itself.

Rams
The cult of the fertility god Khnum in Elephantine made mummies of the sacred ram.

Differences between human and non-human animal mummification 
The distinguishing factor between the process of non-human animal and human mummification is when the two types were mummified. Humans had been mummified consistently since the days of the early conquerors of Lower Egypt, hundreds of years before even the first animal was mummified. The earliest signs of non-human animal mummies are dated to the Badarian Predynastic Period (5500–4000 BC), before the unification of Upper and Lower Egypt. It is likely that animal mummies did not exist earlier on because mummification was less accessible primarily due to cost.

In general, the mummifying of animals was not given the careful attention afforded to humans. Mummies sold to pilgrims as offerings were only minimally treated, and unlike humans, even the most sacred of animals, such as the Apis bulls, did not have their internal organs preserved. The large scale of production indicates that relatively little care and expense was involved in animal preparation compared to human mummies. However, recent radiological studies by archaeologists indicate that animal mummification may more closely follow human mummification than was originally thought. The accepted view is that animals were merely wrapped in coarse linen bandages and/or dipped in resin after death. However, as with human mummification there was a range in terms of the quality of treatments. A simple visual analysis of the mummies suggests that some animal mummies were treated with the same complexity as those of humans. Egyptians treated animals with great respect, regarding them both as domestic pets and representatives of the gods. The presence of fats, oils, beeswax, sugar gum, petroleum bitumen, and coniferous cedar resins in animal mummies shows that the chemicals used to embalm animals were similar to those used on humans.

References 

Mummies
Ancient Egyptian culture
Animal mummies
Votive offering
Badarian culture